Bargfrede is a surname. Notable people with the surname include:

 Hans-Jürgen Bargfrede (born 1959), German footballer 
 Heinz-Günter Bargfrede (born 1942), German politician
 Philipp Bargfrede (born 1989), German footballer 

German-language surnames